Ukhozi FM is a South African national radio station & owned by SABC, based in Durban, KwaZulu-Natal that caters to the needs of the Zulu-speaking community. Founded in 1960, it is the largest radio station in South Africa and Africa (by listenership). The station has a broadcasting licence from ICASA.

Ukhozi means "eagle" in Zulu.

Coverage areas and frequencies 
KwaZulu-Natal
Gauteng
Mpumalanga
North-eastern parts of Eastern Cape
Eastern parts of Free State
Eastern parts of North West
Southern parts of Limpopo

Broadcast languages
IsiZulu

Broadcast time
24/7

Target audience
The station caters to people ranging from young to elderly, however it focuses on the youth.

Listenership figures

History

Background 
From its humble beginnings as a one-minute war time report service, to its current status as the second biggest radio station in the world, Ukhozi FM's history is a long and colourful one.
Ukhozi FM not just as a radio station that broadcasts in isiZulu, but is an archive of the battle for a state-independent voice in broadcasting, a space for preservation and creation of a Zulu identity – negotiating Old and New World influences
As a South African Broadcasting Corporation radio station, each station is obligated to fulfil the mandate of the SABC Limited. Ukhozi FM has a history of delivering on its mandate of entertaining, informing and educating the public. With regards to entertainment the station has promoted local content more so than any other has. This includes the first recording of Ladysmith Black Mambazo in 1960 at its Durban studios, promoting the Soul Brothers, Abafana BaseQhudeni, Mahlathini and MaHotela Queens to name a few. The station has supported many music festivals around the country. Ukhozi FM is a station that has promoted traditional (Maskandi) music through its programming that was championed by Welcome Nzimande who later became the Station Manager since his retirement. 
Through its broadly based programmes, news and current affairs and talk shows the station has grown its listenership to well over 7.5 million listeners.

The Second World War: the forties
Radio, as it developed in South Africa in the 1930s became the space for the propagation of certain ideals and values from a central source. Whilst the space for opposing views existed prior to 1939, the start of the Second World War narrowed the scope for what ideas could and couldn't be transmitted.
The economic influence and power of the English speaking sect in South Africa resulted in radio being used as a tool for pro-British Wartime reports.  In an attempt to make this propaganda as far reaching as possible led to the Native Affairs Department commissioning Charles Mpanza to the South African Broadcasting Corporation (SABC) to transmit these Wartimes reports in isiZulu over the English medium wave service. He was later joined by H.I.E. Dhlomo and then K.E. Masinga who became the first permanently employed black broadcaster of the SABC on 23 December 1941.
Masinga expanded the territory isiZulu broadcasting occupied. Since the material that was broadcast was pre-recorded, Masinga was able to capture pieces of isiZulu culture, mainly music, izibongo (praise poems) and amahubo (isiZulu anthems) at multiple sites and then broadcast the, alongside the Wartime reports, diversifying the use of the airtime given to isiZulu broadcasting. His efforts eventually created a space large enough for the airing of pieces as extensive as izinganekwane (folklore) with the airing of Chief Above and Chief Below, a musical play based on a Zulu legend and co-written with High Tracey), being aired in 1945.

Radio services
Following the end of the Second World War in 1945, the Native Affairs Department withdrew its funding of black broadcasting, no longer having the need for a pro-war propaganda tool.
It was also not economically feasible to continue the black services as only a few black people could afford the radio license and receiver necessary for receipt of transmission.
However, having noted the power of radio and its ability to dispense ideologies, in a climate where urban black people were beginning to vocalise their political ideologies and concerns, the SABC reinstated black services in 1946. IsiZulu broadcasts were continued and grew to include a wider variety of material upon the official increase of airtime to 30 minutes per day.

Apartheid era - the fifties
The year 1950 saw the introduction of the Population Register act and the Group Areas Act, which were pivotal in the division of space according to race, with the Group Areas Act creating urban spaces for white persons. In the years 1951-1952 the focus shifted to the erasure of black spots from those urban areas, with the Bantu Building Workers Act limiting the areas in which black professionals could practice their trades. The Bantu Authorities Act simultaneously took away the unified black voice by abolishing the Native Representative Council and implementing separation within the black community by creating rural homelands along language and ethnicity. The Native Laws Amendment Act and the Natives (Abolition of Passes and Co-Ordination of Documents) Act further restricted the black man's entry into urban areas.
Much of the change affected urban areas and therefore the rediffusion (connection of homes to the SABC via cables) of black urban areas. This rediffusion began in Soweto in 1952, along with an increase in broadcast times 06:00am to 08:30am, 14:15pm to 16:00pm and 18:00pm to 21:00pm for the three main languages, namely isiXhosa, seSotho and isiZulu. Music, drama and news remained the backbone of these broadcasts. The years 1953 to 1958 saw the addition of Jabavu, Dube, Mofolo and Noordgesig being added to broadcast network to accommodate the effects of the implementation of the Bantu Education Act and the Separate Amenities Act.
Increased airtime, along with growing listenership, which included the increasing black labour force as well at the educated elite in urban areas which had access to radio transmission, allowed for greater experimentation with the material being broadcast. The catalogue of isiZulu literature increased as well as the variety of music genres on rotation, which then started to include American Jazz, township jive, traditional music and even gospel music. This expansion of materials allowed radio to cater for the tastes of both the city elite as well as the lesser polished, former 'farm boy' workforce.

Apartheid era: the sixties
The strangling of oppositional political voices, coupled with the unfurling of the euphemisms used for the Apartheid policy, which revealed itself as a means to create a hierarchical separately developed state, marked the 1960s.
The growing volume of the Black critical political voices of resistance during the 1950s, especially through the African National Congress (ANC) and her offspring the Pan African Congress (PAC), along with the success of similar liberation movements across Africa from the grips of colonialism, made the need for a service that dispensed Apartheid ideology to the Black community a necessity as opposed to a luxury for the government of the time. Financial flagging which led to requests for subsidies from the government, the appointment of the head of the Broederbond [the Afrikaner brotherhood driving the Apartheid policies], Piet Meyer, to the position of chairman of the SABC board in 1960 and the subsequent squeezing out of Gideon Roos in 1961, killed any hope the SABC had of maintaining any kind of impartiality as a broadcaster. Furthermore, the Sharpeville Massacre on 21 March 1960, in which a peaceful protest organised by the PAC against Pass laws led to the death of 69 protestors, not only resulted in the banning of the ANC and PAC movements; it inspired a clamp down on political activity, with the government liberally interpreting the term 'communism' as defined in The Suppression of Communism Act13 to mean a carte blanche exiling and banning of any politically oppositional voice.

Radio Bantu
The amassing of these considerations gave birth to an apolitical Black radio service named Radio Bantu, which came into being on 1 June 1960 by way of the Broadcasting Amendment Act14. Its simultaneous creation with that of the approval of transmission over an FM system rather than short or medium wave service was no coincidence. Radio Bantu was to transmit in 5 languages (isiZulu, isiXhosa, Northern and Southern seSotho and seTswana) to the respective ethnic groups in their respectively designated areas, in pursuit of the separate development policy. The VHF/FM system, which connects with landlines and transmits as the crow flies, provided the SABC with the capacity to control the range of transmissions, connecting ethnically common areas and blocking out signals from other ethnicities' stations. Following the building of the first FM transmitter in Brixton, Johannesburg in 1961, the first locally manufactured FM receiver was marketed in 1963. These cheap portable gadgets - which ran on batteries and were accessible to both the rural and urban listener, broadening the reach of Apartheid ideology - cut out the possibility of receiving hostile (i.e. politically conscious) foreign broadcasts which were picked up by the unpredictable, more expensive short wave receivers. 
Radio Bantu increased its broadcast time to 17.5 hours in 1962; over double the 8hrs they had initially received in 1960. It seemed only natural that this largely blank canvas would absorb the creative spirits still present in South Africa; coaxing material in spoken, written and sung form. The initial intake of announcers16, who were all professionally trained as teachers, proved to be jacks of all trades, interchangeably writing, producing and announcing. Given no guiding course on broadcasting, these announcers crafted their own styles, laying the foundation of a broadcasting culture that celebrates uniqueness. The realm of radio drama became the home for wordsmiths like novelist Muntu Xulu, a young D.B.Z Ntuli, linguist and oral poetry critic P.N. Msimang, and old hand R.R.R Dhlomo17. Forms of presentation of these dramas disrupted accepted tropes, with Alexius Buthelezi elevating the production of dramas infused with folklore and musical scores, beginning with the play uNobathakathi [1963] and Mandla Sibiya popularising the serial radio drama, beginning with uDeliwe [February 1964]. Where the coffers of recording labels dictated a focus on commercially successful artists, Radio Bantu recorded rocks in the rough, guided only by the pleasure principle. As a result, Radio Bantu became the sounding board for underexposed genres, launching budding vocalist into the industry.
The world of isiZulu literature contemporaneously received a resting place and an injection of life. The novels of C.L.S Nyembezi and Muntu Xulu were committed to popular memory in December 1964 and 1966 respectively, when recorded and transmitted to the listeners, while Alexius Buthelezi inducted the works of John Bunyan and John Strauss into the repertoire of isiZulu literary enthusiasts; the former being a translated version of Pilgrim's Progress (Uhambo lomhambi) aired in the early 1960s and the latter being an interpretation of an opera named Ibuzwa Kwabaphambili aired in January 1965.

Radio drama and the revolution
In the wake of the strict silencing of political voice, the culture of latently planted revolutionary thought permeated some of the radio dramas; most notably those of Alexius Buthelezi. The earliest of these was the 1960s series Chakijane; a drama based on the Zulu folktale trickster told through musical format. The resurrection of this character not only conserved this orally inherited treasure, in the context of political and social repression, his freedom of movement and ability to combat the most seemingly impossible of foes and situations meant Chakijane's presence on air mimicked and could be viewed as a symbol of the underground resistance movements and thus a celebration thereof. In a time where White supremacy was becoming physically articulated by space and the force feeding of Christianity was being misused as the means of justification for this racialised stratification, uNokhwezi18 found her way onto radio. This self-contained play followed the journey of a young beautiful woman who wins the affections of the most eligible bachelor in the Chiefdom, becomes the victim of other women's jealousy and finds herself wandering through a dark forest with only a necklace, which was given to her by her mother, who had been advised to do so by her ancestors, that in the end protects her. This invocation of ancestral belief can be seen as a challenge to the dominant ideology of misused Christianity and its implication of Blackness being a synonym for a lesser being. In the process, Buthelezi goes about preserving certain izibongo and experimenting with emotive sound. Muntu Xulu's play Icala lombango (July 1967) also went about capturing izibongo and amahubo along with old isiZulu and the newly developing Mozambiquan dialect of isiZulu in the process of telling the story.

Apartheid era: the seventies
Through Radio Bantu, government policy was preached to deter the youth from activating their consciousness.
This trend continued at Radio Bantu, whose broadcasting time increased to 24 hours in 1978, making it a canvas upon which battle lines were drawn; a push and pull between government ideology and multiply defined resistance. The move of the SABC from the Ministry of Post and Telegraphs to the Ministry of National Education under Van der Spuy aligned Radio Bantu directly with the heartbeat of the Apartheid state; Bantu education. Having noted that the key to sustaining the status quo of White supremacy/Black subservience was the creation of a generation educated in a reality of subservience, the School Radio Service began focusing its attentions on younger standards; neglecting to touch on home language and aboriginal cultural instruction. The removal of Geography and Citizenship [a programme directed at educating Black persons about the conditions of their South African citizenship following legislative changes] in 1970 from the lesson roll respectively served the making of parochial Black persons who remained unaware of a life outside their present reality and voiced the exclusion of Blacks from the banner of South African citizenship. Furthermore, the removal of the Bantu composers programme (1973) and the editing out of ethnic history from the History lesson script (1974) stripped the Service entirely of its mask as a supplementary cultural education source. Attempts to feign impartiality firstly faded then vanished completely. The conversion of the programme for teachers to a ‘series for the educated Bantu’ in 1973 presented itself as an intellectuals paradise, but was in fact a means to punt the ideology of homelands to educated fence-sitters. By 1975, the blatant correlation between changes in the Bantu education policy [following the Afrikaans Medium Decree of 1974], which dictated that the medium of instruction to be used from Std 5 upwards was Afrikaans, and Radio Bantu, which aired a 10 lesson preparation for this on the School Radio Service and subsequently removed older standards from the lesson roll, meant the line between SABC and the government became so blurred that it was almost non-existent. Within this politically impotent environment were members of staff like Thokozani Nene, Thetha Masombuka and Koos Hadebe who explored the foggy separation between these two institutions, attempting to maintain some objectivity. Nene, who joined Radio Bantu as a news reader in 1971, consciously prefaced his news bulletins with the disclaimer that the news being broadcast was state (Johannesburg) prepared and used praise poems, whose format lends itself to poetic and archaic language and heavily references Zulu history, to address the listeners in the introduction and conclusion to his news bulletins. Hadebe, who joined Radio Zulu as a sports commentator under the wing of Thetha Masombuka in 1974 following the splitting of Radio Bantu as an umbrella Black radio service into separate language services along ethnic lines, would broadcast soccer matches in Zulu on the weekend, then translate them into siNdebele and siSwati for the weekday sports shows with Masombuka. Nene's effort to educate his audience in history and culture (lived and linguistic) and Hadebe's multi-ethnic-serving broadcasts with Masombuka aligned their work with two greater resistance movements in motion at the time.
Nene, Hadebe and Masombuka's presence on the airwaves thus acted as resistance-booster-shots in a cesspool of government infected transmissions.

Separation of language services
The separation of language services cleanly severed ethnicities from each other, but it also created a forum that documented the complexly layered Zulu identity developing within an ever shifting reality. Recordings in 1970 of traditional sounds like that of Ladysmith Black Mamabazo's, an isicathamiya collective, first LP (Amabutho) at the SABC studios in Durban being contrasted with the use of multiple existing isiZulu dialects in the politically ignorant uBhekifa were the early signs of a dynamic culture; frozen in some aspects but fluid in others. Following the separation of stations into ethnicities, the content being broadcast exhibited more signs of a culture in a constant cycle of redefinition; both protecting and breeding extensions of this identity. Thokozani Nene's use of language became a poster child for this process of renegotiation; resurrecting unused words of old alongside his own newly coined ones. Cyril Bongani ‘Kansas City’ Mchunu, who joined Radio Zulu as a disc jockey in the 1970s, reflected the multiple influences the traditional Zulu identity was grappling with, traversing lines of separation by nicknaming himself and signalling his presence on air through an American tune while at the same time using street lingo, original slang and other local languages like seSotho and English to create his uniquely blended style of announcing. Furthermore, his popularisation of call-in shows provided an open line of communication for Zulu persons across physically divided spaces; highlighting commonalities and exposing nuanced differences. The content of the radio dramas, however, were the most telling symbols of a nation at odds with its core values and customs. In May 1979, the airing of Abangane Ababi by Abigail Zondi followed the journey of a young woman moving between the city and ruralscape. The series raised questions about gender roles, taboo issues of divorce and out-the-box women and the situations and possible dangers specific to a female city populant. This engagement with contemporary-social was silver lined with throwbacks to female izibongo stylings, further expanding the knowledge archive in terms of feminine contributions to traditional arts. Kwaphambana izinkomishi, written by Maqhawe Mkhize in the 1970s, stirred the underbelly of the custom of polygamy and its real inspirations of evil and jealousy between wives, and allowed for a further exploration of a still largely untapped source of women's oral poetry. Radio Zulu thus became a reflection of a nation lumped together by lineage circumstance collectively contributing to the creation of a choppy narrative of what it meant when one self-identified or was identified as Zulu in those times.

Political change: the eighties
Following the collapse of one of the last standing countries in Africa to be ruled by a White minority (Rhodesia, which is now Zimbabwe), in 1980, the propensity of the majority to remain silent in the face of a heavy-handed repressive state began to crumble. Through the cracks rose up a ballsy multi-vocal internal resistance; initially fragmented into tiny groups combating specific gripes with the state until the introduction of the United Democratic Front (UDF) in 1983. UDF did not seek to dilute separate political agendas into a collectively agreed upon solo agenda but instead propagated an alliance that allowed each organisation to maintain its individual identity, uniting only on immediate and shared disgruntlements as a collective and effective resistant to the Apartheid state. The strength of a front that allowed self-synecdoche, the avenging spirit of movements left behind especially in the 1960s and 1970s following a savage state brutality and protracted shunning from across borders and overseas proved to be too much of a pressure cooker situation for the Apartheid government, leading P.W. Botha, the president at the time, to declare a State of Emergency on 20 July 1985; a state that would last for the next four years.
Radio Zulu did not remain immune to the fever of political fervour infecting the nation at the time. Although acts of censorship were still being practiced, blatant acts of insubordination in the form of noticeably political content slipped under the axing process and into the homes of listeners. Rev. Mbatha's recording and subsequent airing of one of Rev. Beyers Naude's notorious English sermons to his Black parish, in which he criticised the heavy police presence in the daily lives of township dwellers following the State of Emergency in 1985, broke the rules of the apolitical, strictly isiZulu radio service.

Radio Metro (now Metro FM)
Points of difference amongst Zulu listeners became so apparent that by 1986 it was suggested a new radio station be created for the burgeoning Black middle class who were of a more ‘sophisticated and elite’ persuasion. Radio Metro, which was introduced on 1 September 1986 as an English medium commercial Black radio station serving the major metropolises across the country under the management of Koos Hadebe [previously a sports announcer on Radio Zulu] and whose introduction shaved down Radio Zulu's hours from 24 to 18.5, not only highlighted the irreducibility of Zulu identity to one articulation, it also exposed the Achilles heel of government control over broadcasting; commerce. The existence of a radio station that broadcast to a non-ethnically divided audience – inadvertently promoting black unity – in a separation-obsessed state was only possible largely due to the new profit-making opportunities it provided. In unpacking some of its listeners to Radio Metro, Radio Zulu began shaking the foundation of Black broadcasting; moving it from being ethnically driven, to being business driven.

The nineties
A country in constant negotiation with its identity in pursuit of redefinition as a diverse but unified state is the sentiment that best describes the tone in South Africa in the 1990s.
Following his appointment to State presidency in September 1989, F.W. de Klerk cemented his position as one of the key players who brought Apartheid to an end when, on 2 February 1990, he announced the removal of the ban placed on all anti-Apartheid groups from as early as 30 years before then. This meant that older political groups like the ANC, the South African Communist Party (SACP) and the PAC, whose operations had been exiled, could return their activities to the country, while younger parties like UDF and IFP could grow their organisations outside the restrictive box that was the Apartheid state. This move began a snow ball process of negotiations intended to peacefully hand over power, the construction of what would become one of the most liberal Constitutions seen globally and the repealing, revision and adoption of laws that coincided with the pillars of the new dispensation – those being dignity, equality and freedom. Quite coincidentally the closing of the chapter on Apartheid in history books was simultaneous with the end of an era in isiZulu broadcasting, as K.E. Masinga, one of the founding fathers of Radio Bantu, was laid to rest in the same year.

From content to commercial
Within this whirlwind of change, Radio Zulu experienced its own washing machine cycle of new. In 1991, following a history of Whites only management, Radio Zulu broke away from tradition and appointed previous announcer Reverend Howie (Hawu) Mbatha as the first Black station manager. His occupation of the position acted as a catalyst for a return to the Schlesinger27 approach, which entailed turning the station into a well oiled business; continuing Black broadcasting's separation of self from ethnically driven content towards commercially driven content. Resourceful management, in terms of minimising costs by keeping manpower at a minimum, resulted in the return of Radio Zulu to a 24-hour service. A visit to the US that introduced Mbatha to equipment which allowed for live broadcasts coupled with a desire to return the station to one that served its listeners in truth led to Cyril ‘Kansas City’ Mchunu's call-in shows becoming the guinea-pig playground for live interactions with and amongst listeners. The product of these elements created an economically self-sufficient radio station that experienced a growth spurt; from 2.6 million to 5 million listeners in the space of a year. On the heels of this success, sports broadcasts began reflecting the beginnings of a society attempting to integrate. Philip Zwane's coverage of the Natal v Border friendly rugby match mirrored attempts to introduce previously exclusive realms to each other, by broadcasting a previously Whites only sport on a Black radio station. In addition to this, Radio Zulu's inclusion of South Africa's first game when readmitted to FIFA, against Cameroon, signalled the induction of the country back into the international playing field in a wider sense. 
Radio Zulu, in its structure and content, rose up to the task set by the impending democratic state; that being a state that allowed for representation of previous minorities. At the start of 1994, the appointment of aptly qualified Zamambo Mkhize to the position of station manager marked the elevation of a member of a previously ignored group; black women.

Radio content monitoring
In the same year, on 30 March, the formation of the Independent Broadcasting Authority (now known as ICASA) – a state independent body tasked with monitoring the content transmitted by broadcasters – was intended to sever the power government wielded over broadcasters during Apartheid, providing room for minority and more importantly dissident opinions to be aired and debated.

Madiba Magic
Subsequent to the first democratic elections on 27 April 1994, in which ANC's Nelson 'Madiba' Mandela became the first president following an inclusive vote, the push for the face of a country at peace with its differences began. . Flushed by what would be dubbed 'Madiba Magic', this period exuded a delicate optimism that snapped at reminders of Apartheid's attempt to drive deep wedges between citizens of the country. For this reason, there were mixed reactions to keeping Radio Zulu as a purely isiZulu broadcasting service. Some argued that the maintenance of ethnically defined stations defeated the task of liberating South Africa from the clutches of segregation and deduced that financial considerations [the success of Radio Zulu as a business model] were being placed above the greater task of national accord, while others argued that Radio Zulu should be interpreted in the new order as a platform for the celebration of one of the many chalk and cheese cultures occupying South Africa; the promotion of a previous minority. However, Radio Zulu was kept on as an SABC radio service, changing its name to Ukhozi FM (Ukhozi meaning 'eagle') in 1996.

Ukhozi FM – the new millennium and beyond
With a listenership of over 7.5 million, Ukhozi FM has been and is more than a radio station; it is a reflector, a self-standing testimony to the many lives that have been and are being lived here.
Ukhozi FM is still the home of 7.9 million isiZulu speakers, who tune into the station every day to be informed, educated and entertained in their home language.

Notable Show Hosts
Linda Sibiya, former Vuka Mzansi Breakfast Show and The Afternoon Drive host and producer (2007-2016).
bhodloza nzimande "ngulube encane", former
mroza buthelezi
selbeyonce mkhize
nongcebo Mackenzie
tshata ngobese
zimiphi "zimdollar"biyela
Nkosinathi Musa "The Dr love" Mshengu,Ezingasoze zabunda and Ikhaya loKhozi host.

References

External links
 Ukhozi FM Website

Radio stations in Durban
Zulu-language mass media